Never Say Never is the second studio album by American singer Brandy. It was released on June 9, 1998, by Atlantic Records. Atlantic consulted David Foster, as well as producer Rodney "Darkchild" Jerkins and his team to work with Norwood on the record; Jerkins went on to craft the majority of the album and would evolve as Norwood's mentor and head producer on her succeeding projects.

The lyrical themes on the album include the singer's personal experiences with love, monogamy, media bias, and maturity. Influenced by Mariah Carey and Whitney Houston, Norwood wanted to present a more mature facet of herself with the album, incorporating a ballad-heavy style and an adult contemporary feel into her urban pop sound for the album.

Upon its release, Never Say Never facilitated Norwood in becoming a viable recording artist with media-crossing appeal. It debuted at No. 3 on the US Billboard 200 chart, selling 160,000 copies in its first week, and peaked at No. 2 the following week, remaining within the chart's top 20 for 28 weeks. Six of the album's 16 songs were chosen as singles, including duet with Monica "The Boy Is Mine" and "Have You Ever?", which both topped the US Billboard Hot 100, as well as "Top of the World", which become an international hit.

Never Say Never became Norwood's highest-selling and highest-charting album to date in most international markets, being certified quintuple platinum by the Recording Industry Association of America (RIAA) and selling over 16 million copies worldwide. It won numerous awards and accolades, including a Grammy Award for Best R&B Performance by a Duo or Group with Vocals for "The Boy Is Mine". The album was supported by the Never Say Never World Tour (1999), which included sold-out shows in North America, Europe, & Asia.

Background and development
Following the release of her multi-platinum eponymous debut album (1994) and several equally successful soundtrack contributions such as "Sittin' Up in My Room" from Waiting to Exhale (1995) and "Missing You" from Set It Off (1996), Norwood took a lengthy musical break in which she graduated from high school, enrolled in college and established a flourishing acting career. In 1995, she was cast in the titular role in the UPN sitcom Moesha, and in the following two years, she appeared opposite her idol Whitney Houston in the musical television film Cinderella (1997) and filmed the slasher film sequel I Still Know What You Did Last Summer (1998). While she enjoyed her acting profile accomplishments, Norwood felt that her transition had caused people to recognize her more as an actress than as a singer, though she was still considering music her career priority. Suffering from what she called "sophomore album jitters" however, it became difficult for Norwood to go in the studio and really produce. Thus, she found herself making excuses to Atlantic artists and repertoire heads Paris Davis and Craig Kallman to avoid singing.

While she was preparing to start work of her second studio album by October 1997, previous meetings with Atlantic Records had been unfruitful. Barely satisfied with the material that was presented to her, the recording of new music was postponed several times until 1997, as Norwood found that many songs would not express what she wanted to tell at that point of her career. "Many of the songs I heard were not 'me'," the singer stated during a promotional interview with Jet in 1999, "And If I can't feel it, then I won't sing it." Also, after Brandy, she felt in a space of wanting to do something different, while exploring her voice and playing with different sounds. Elaborating on her desire for progression and a more mature sound, Norwood added, that  "I'm not the little girl I was when I made my first record. My voice is a strong instrument now; my vocals come from both my heart and my diaphragm. My heart because I matured in the four years since the last album; I'm more emotionally there."

Recording and production

Later that year, Norwood requested rapper–songwriter Missy Elliott as one of the producers for her album. However, Atlantic refused the approach to have Norwood work with Elliott and her regular co-producer Timbaland following their work with label mate and fellow teen R&B singer Aaliyah on her second studio album One in a Million, released the year before. Impressed with his work on Mary J. Blige's 1997 album Share My World, Davis called then-newcomer Rodney "Darkchild" Jerkins to meet with Norwood at Georgias, a restaurant in Los Angeles. Accompanied by his brother Fred Jerkins III and songwriter LaShawn Daniels, he ended up completing five songs in five days with her, including “Learn the Hard Way”, “Happy”, “Put That on Everything,” and title track “Never Say Never.” Satisfied with their output, Atlantic Records secured a production deal with Jerkins's team and encouraged them to work on more material for the album. With Jerkins and his team producing the majority on the album, he was eventually promoted to executive producer on the album.

Jerkins and his circle worked excessively on the album, with typical sessions starting in the afternoon and lasting until the early morning hours. Despite the physical distance between the recording studios and Jerkins's native in New Jersey, he brought many of his family and friends to Los Angeles to help work on the album. His brother Fred quit his steady job working at Prudential Insurance Company to work with Norwood on Never Say Never, while his sister Sybil received co-writing credits on the album. Drawing from their own experiences, many titles of Never Say Never were built on a cliché book in the studio. With Jerkins being inspired by the singer/producer partnerships of Jimmy Jam & Terry Lewis and Janet Jackson as well as the influence of DeVante Swing on Jodeci's sound, he envisioned a full body of work for Norwood's second album, telling: "I wanted to make records where you fell in love with and heard the journey of the artists from beginning to end. The intro is just as important as the song, the outro is just as important. Once I got Brandy to believe in that vision, then we just locked in."

Apart from Jerkins and Darkchild crew, Norwood also worked with Canadian producer David Foster on the album. Lending a certain level of adult contemporary–pop crossover credibility to the project, he would produce three songs on Never Say Never, including "Have You Ever?," written by his frequent collaborator Diane Warren, the Gordon Chambers-penned "One Voice" and "(Everything I Do) I Do It for You," a cover version of Canadian singer Bryan Adams's 1991 song. Norwood credited the chemistry with both producers with her musical growth: "They brought out the best in me, the vocals I didn't know I had," she said. Encouraged by Jerkins to share her feelings and participate in the record making process, Norwood wrote and produced on the majority of the album. Nevertheless, after Brandys commercial success, she was heavily pressured, stating: "It's very important to me that my music connects with the general public.

Music and lyrics
The album's opening track "Angel in Disguise" is a Rodney Jerkins-produced mid-tempo track that features backing vocals by fellow R&B singer Joe. It consists of a "dribbling bass line" that Chuck Taylor of Billboard compared to a "dreamlike, moonlit night". The harmonic background song, created using the so-called multi-track recording, was described as "enchanting" and "seductive". The lyrics of "Angel in Disguise" describe a protagonist who still loves her partner despite his infidelity, with Norwood quoted: "An angel in disguise she was / But somehow you fell for her / Till she broke your heart that day / And left you in the rain / But still I love you". Set as the album's lead single, "The Boy Is Mine" was originally intended to be a solo song for Brandy, but due to Monica's success at the time, it was conceived as a duet. Inspired by Michael Jackson and Paul McCartney's 1982 duet "The Girl Is Mine", the lyrics of the mid-tempo R&B track revolve around two women fighting over a man. "Learn the Hard Way" is the album's fourth track and shares similarities with the album's title track. The Guy Roche-produced "Almost Doesn't Count" follows; its lyrics revolve around its writer Shelly Peiken's powerful but unfruitful on-again, off-again relationship she had with a man while in college. Peiken recalled her emotions during a writing session with Roche decades later when she "dug up that laundry list of all the 'almosts' I felt we had, and we put it into the song." In a 2020 interview, she further elaborated about the lyrics: "It was a relationship that was more in my head than in his, and I always felt like we almost got there, he almost said I love you, he almost broke up with the girlfriend he had the whole time. He almost faced his feelings but he never quite got there – maybe that was all in my head too. Maybe he never had any of those feelings, maybe it was all my imagination." Brandy performed the song in the 1999 television film Double Platinum, starring Diana Ross and herself. The international single "Top of the World" is the album's sixth track. It is a collaboration with Mase and talks about Brandy as a popstar "just trying to be her" and not feeling like being in her own world.

The Darkchild-produced "U Don't Know Me (Like U Used To)", which is the album's seventh and final single, is noted for its remix version with Shaunta and Da Brat. The title track, also produced by Rodney Jerkins, is the eighth song of the album. "Truthfully", a ballad about a broken relationship, was written by former Boyz II Men member, singer-songwriter Marc Nelson. Recorded in a single take, it took Nelson five different sessions to get Norwood in the recording studio as she felt initially nervous about working with him. Main production on the song was helmed by Harvey Mason, Jr., who received his first major placement as a producer on "Truthfully". Mason was consulted by Jerkins after he had shopped around several tracks for record executives. The No. 1 single "Have You Ever?" is the album's tenth track. Brandy states that it was the first time she had been in the studio with a producer like David Foster, initially being nervous about recording the song. In the song's lyrics, Norwood sings about unrequited love with lyrics such as "Have you finally found the one you've given your heart to / Only to find that one will not give their heart to you". "Put That on Everything", a mid-tempo ballad, is the album's eleventh track. The album's twelfth track "In the Car Interlude" is actually a phone conversation in the car between Brandy, Rodney and Fred Jerkins. "Happy", an R&B up-tempo song, was the album's thirteenth track. It was also featured in Double Platinum and received positive reception from Rolling Stone. It also served as the theme song of the 2002 MTV reality television series Brandy: Special Delivery. "One Voice", the fourteenth track, was the official UNICEF theme song during its 50th anniversary celebration. Entertainment Weekly describes her voice in the song as "soft and smoky" and as a "gospel-fired ballad that finds her effortlessly raising the roof". "Tomorrow", a nearly six-minutes-long ballad, is the fifteenth track and the album's longest song. The final song on the album is the Bryan Adams cover "(Everything I Do) I Do It for You".

Release and promotion
Never Say Never was released in the United States on June 9, 1998, by Atlantic Records; its double-disc limited edition was released exclusively in Australia on July 13, 1999. Promotion for Never Say Never began with Brandy's appearance on music magazine Vibes April 1998 cover, followed by a massive print campaign, including cover shoots for Teen People and Ebony as well as coverage in fanzines. The co-marketing venture between Vibe and Atlantic Records resulted in a number of joint projects, such as a Vibe–Brandy website, a college marketing tour, and several retail and radio promotions. With television channel MTV, Brandy hosted the network's spring break shows in Jamaica on March 13–15.

On May 14, Brandy performed "The Boy Is Mine" for the first time, solo on The Tonight Show with Jay Leno. In June, Brandy performed "Top of the World" alongside Mase at the 1998 MTV Movie Awards. On June 13,  MTV aired a special in which Brandy presented a video countdown that consisted of her favorite music videos. The following day, MTV produced a 30-minute Ultra Sound segment special about her. On June 16, Brandy appeared on CBS This Morning. On July 17, Brandy went on The View ; Three days later, she appeared on Live with Regis and Kathie Lee. On July 22, Brandy appeared on Late Night with Conan O'Brien. On August 28, she made yet another appearance on The Tonight Show with Jay Leno ; this time performing "Have You Ever". On September 3, Brandy performed the remix version of "Top of the World" alongside rappers Big Pun and Fat Joe at the Soul Train Lady of Soul Awards. Also in September, Brandy and Monica performed "The Boy Is Mine" live for the first time together at the 1998 MTV Video Music Awards. On September 26, Brandy performed at the Hip-Hop Unity Festival held at the Los Angeles Memorial Coliseum. On October 11, Brandy performed at the 1998 International Achievement in Arts Awards. Two days later she made an appearance on The Rosie O'Donnell Show.

On January 11, 1999, Brandy and actress Melissa Joan Hart hosted the 1999 American Music Awards at the Shrine Auditorium in Los Angeles. During the award ceremony, she performed her song "Have You Ever?". On January 31, Brandy and rapper LL Cool J hosted Miami radio station WEDR's Super Bowl concert, surrounding Super Bowl XXXIII. In March 1999, Brandy joined former First Lady Hillary Rodham Clinton and Attorney General Janet Reno at the National Museum of Women in the Arts to recognize six young women that were selected for the second annual Volunteerism Awards. On April 13, Brandy performed alongside  Whitney Houston, Tina Turner, Cher, Chaka Khan, and Faith Hill, among others, at VH1 Divas Live '99. By May 1999, Brandy had embarked on a world tour with shows in France, Germany, the Netherlands, and Japan. Also in May, she performed "Almost Doesn't Count" on The Tonight Show with Jay Leno In June, Brandy returned to the US for the North American leg of her tour which was originally scheduled to run from June 18 to August 2. The tour was cut short because she had to film the then-upcoming fifth season of her UPN sitcom Moesha. On September 8, 1999, she performed "U Don't Know Me (Like U Used To)", on The Tonight Show with Jay Leno.

In retail, a Brandy standee was provided to merchants, while the album was made part of "price and positing" programs at all major national accounts and urban indie accounts nationally upon its release. Other marketing items for Never Say Never included a partnering with DC Comics, which created a Brandy comic book in September 1998 for junior high and high school students. Atlantic also discussed plans with Disney for a cross-promotion between the home video version of Cinderella (1997) and the album, as well as the production of a major TV special, involving corporate sponsors.

Singles
"The Boy Is Mine", a duet with singer Monica, was the first song to be lifted from Never Say Never in May 1998. Released to generally positive reviews from contemporary music critics, it became the first No. 1 pop record for both artists, both stateside and internationally. In the United States, "The Boy Is Mine" became the best-selling song of the year, spending 13 weeks on top of the US Billboard Hot 100 during the summer of 1998. It was certified double platinum by the Recording Industry Association of America (RIAA) and ranked eighth on Billboards decade-end chart. Internationally, the single also achieved a strong charting, peaking at No. 1 in Canada, the Netherlands and New Zealand, while reaching the top five on most of the other charts on which it appeared. "Top of the World" featuring rapper Mase served as the album's second single. The song was less successful around the world, but reached No. 2 on the UK Singles Chart. It was certified silver by the British Phonographic Industry (BPI) on October 23, 1998.

"Have You Ever?" was released as the album's third single throughout fall 1998. It became the second song from Never Say Never to reach the top position on both the Billboard Hot 100 and the New Zealand Singles Chart, while reaching the top twenty in most English-speaking countries. The ballad garnered a generally mixed reception from critics and was ranked 14th on Billboards 1999 year-end chart. Midtempo track "Angel in Disguise" featuring prominent backing vocals by singer Joe, was released as a radio single on January 21, 1999, in the United States only. It reached the top twenty on the Billboards Hot R&B/Hip-Hop Songs based on airplay alone. "Almost Doesn't Count" was released in the second quarter of 1999, serving as the album's fifth single. The ballad reached the top twenty on the majority of all charts it appeared on and was promoted by a performance in the 1999 film Double Platinum, starring Diana Ross and Brandy herself.

"U Don't Know Me (Like U Used To)" was selected as the album's fifth single and marked the final single to be released from Never Say Never in North America. A minor commercial success, the song reached No. 79 on the Billboard Hot 100 and the top thirty on the Hot R&B/Hip-Hop Songs chart. In support of the single, a remix version of the track featuring female rappers Shaunta and Da Brat was released, accompanied by a remix EP entitled U Don't Know Me... Like U Used To – The Remix EP. In German-speaking Europe, "U Don't Know Me (Like U Used To)" appeared as a B-side on the promotional single "Never Say Never". It failed to chart, however. In Oceania, the Bryan Adams cover "(Everything I Do) I Do It for You" was released as the album's sixth single instead. It reached No. 28 on the New Zealand Singles Chart.

Critical reception

Never Say Never received mostly positive reviews from music critics. Stephen Thomas Erlewine from AllMusic gave the album four out of five stars and noted it a "better, more adventurous record than her debut," adding: "Brandy wisely decides to find a middle ground between Mariah Carey and Mary J. Blige — it's adult contemporary with a slight streetwise edge. [Her] delivery has improved and her subdued vocals can make mediocre material sound convincing. Still, what makes Never Say Never a winning record is the quality songs and production." Daryl Easlea from BBC Music felt that the collection of smooth, mid-paced jams provided a snapshot of commercial R&B from the era. He described Never Say Never "as the epitome of a mixed bag. However, given that a lot of R&B in the late 90s sounds like an ornate musical box revolving, the album is an intelligent brew that deviates sufficiently from that template and plays to Brandy and executive producer Rodney Jerkins's considerable strengths."

Paul Verna from Billboard gave the album a mixed review. Verna felt that Brandy showed maturity and confidence on songs like "The Boy Is Mine"; yet the album as a whole was filled with “trend-conscious moves” from guest raps from Mase to “sound alike melodies ” similar to Janet Jackson. Overall, he expressed that Brandy should focus more on developing her own artistry opposed to imitating other artists. The Spokesman-Review critic Richard Harrington was positive with the album, writing: "Brandy is co-writer on six of the album's 16 songs and no matter their achievement lyrically, she finds herself grown-up and confident, without taking any false steps."

Rolling Stone magazine was generally positive with the album, giving it three stars out of five stars rating, and wrote: "Brandy exudes more pizazz than the Hanson brothers combined and bursts with enough naive charm to make Jewel look like a jaded sailor. Her second album bubbles with that same effervescence [...]." J. D. Considine, reviewer for Entertainment Weekly, felt that Norwood's voice was lacking passion on the album. Although he indicated that it was "hard to argue with Brandy's deference to the rhythm, especially when she rides one of producer Rodney Jerkins itchily propulsive tracks," he also noted that it was flattening "its emotional range, until the romantic bliss of "Happy," the dogged determination of "Never Say Never," and the conflicted affection of "Angel in Disguise" all end up sounding pretty much the same." He gave the album a B rating. Angela Lewis, writer for The Independent was disappointed with the album, saying: "This is pop R&B without the soul, and could see Brandy without a future in the adult big league. She lacks real command of tracks like "Have You Ever?", showing she's better at playing by the rules than anything else."  In his Consumer Guide, Robert Christgau gave the album a two-star honorable mention and picked out its three songs ("The Boy Is Mine", "U Don't Know Me" and "Almost Doesn't Count") while describing Brandy as "America's sweetheart, and why not?"

Accolades

|-
! scope="row" rowspan="2"| 1998
| rowspan="2"| MTV Video Music Award
| Video of the Year
| rowspan="8"| "The Boy Is Mine"
| 
| rowspan="5"| 
|-
| Best R&B Video
| 
|-
! scope="row" rowspan="3"| 1998
| rowspan="3"| Billboard Music Award
| Hot 100 Sales Single of the Year
| 
|-
| R&B Sales Single of the Year
| 
|-
| Dance Maxi Sales Single of the Year
| 
|-
! scope="row" rowspan="4"| 1999
| rowspan="4"| Grammy Award
| Record of the Year
| 
| rowspan="4"| 
|-
| Best R&B Song
| 
|-
| Best R&B Performance by a Duo or Group with Vocals
| 
|-
| Best R&B Album
| rowspan="3"| Never Say Never
| 
|-
! scope="row"| 1999
| Echo Award
| Newcomer of the year, International
| 
| 
|-
! scope="row" rowspan="2"| 1999
| rowspan="2"| Soul Train Music Award
| Best Female R&B/Soul Album, Female
| 
| rowspan="2"| 
|-
| Best R&B/Soul Single, Group, Band or Duo
| "The Boy Is Mine"
| 
|-
! scope="row"| 1999
| MTV Video Music Award
| Best R&B Video
| "Have You Ever?"
| 
| 
|-
! scope="row"| 2000
| Grammy Award
| Best Female R&B Vocal Performance
| "Almost Doesn't Count"
| 
| 
|}

Commercial performance
Never Say Never debuted at No. 3 on the Billboard 200 for the week of June 16, 1998, selling 160,000 units in its first week–Norwood's largest first-week sales. The following week, the album managed to climb up to its peak position at No. 2, even though its sales had dipped slightly to 152,000 copies. On the US Top R&B/Hip-Hop Albums chart the album debuted and peaked at No. 2; where it charted for 68 consecutive weeks. By its 14th week on the Billboard 200 chart, Never Say Never had sold 1.4 million copies. By December 1998, Never Say Never sold 2.6 million copies in the United States. In January 1999 the album was ranked as the 13th best-selling album of 1998 with total sales at 2.9 million. The following year in January 2000, the album was the 62nd best-selling album of 1999 selling 1.3 million copies during that year. In March 2002 sales for the album stood at over 4.4 million copies sold. In February 2003 the album sold an additional 665,000 copies through BMG Music Club. By June 2004 Never Say Never sold 4.5 million copies. In total it has spent 72 consecutive weeks on the Billboard 200—28 of which were within the top 20—and as of 2012, the album has sold 4.6 million copies in the United States according to Nielsen Soundscan. In December 1999, the album was certified quintuple platinum by the Recording Industry Association of America (RIAA) for five million shipped units.

In Canada Never Say Never debuted on [[RPM (magazine)|RPM s Top Albums/CDs]] chart at No. 3 on the issue dated June 29, 1998. The album remained at No. 3 for two additional weeks on the weeks ending on July 6 and July 13, 1998. Overall, the album has spent a total of 54 consecutive weeks on the Top Albums/CDs chart. On August 27, 1999, the album was certified Quadruple platinum by Music Canada for denoting shipments of 400,000 units. In the UK the album debuted at No. 21 on the UK Albums Chart on June 14, 1998. In its tenth week, the album climbed to a new peak of No. 19. The album went on to sell 260,000 copies in the United Kingdom, and was eventually certified platinum by the British Phonographic Industry (BPI), denoting shipments of 300,000 copies. By May 1999, Never Say Never had sold seven million copies worldwide, according to Billboard.
In January 2000, Yahoo! Music reported that Never Say Never had been certified quadruple platinum in Canada, double platinum in Japan, platinum in Australia, New Zealand and South Africa, and gold in Ireland, Germany, France, Denmark, the Philippines, Indonesia and Malaysia. To date, the album remains Norwood's biggest-selling effort with worldwide sales in excess of 16 million copies.

Impact and legacy
While her debut album had been a major success in the United States, Never Say Never was credited with Norwood's international breakthrough and facilitated her in becoming a viable recording artist with media–crossing appeal in music, film, and television. Claire Lobenfeld from Fact found that while "Brandy's self-titled debut was sweet and flirty, its follow-up separated her from being just a pop singer with an accelerating star to one with something to say." HipHopDXs Aaron McKrell remarked that "Brandy's newfound maturity was reflected in her music, and audiences and critics alike raved about the pop-tinged R&B that permeated the album," with Lela Olds, writing for The Boombox, further reporting that she "grew confident as both an artist and a young woman on Never Say Never, creating an album that showed both personal and vocal growth." Never Say Never is Norwood's most successful album to date, with worldwide sales of 14 million records, including singles and album copies. One of the biggest-selling album of the year for WEA Music, Billboard ranked Never Say Never among the most successful comeback albums of 1998.

Musically, Never Say Never blueprinted Norwood's signature "silky, smooth sound" which would also dominate on following projects. In a 2018 anniversary retrospective, Vibe editor Brittney Fennell declared Never Say Never as Norwood's "career-defining magnum opus." She felt that "it is arguably one of the best R&B albums of the 90s [...] There were a plethora of young female R&B singers at this time, but Brandy's star power allowed her to transcend genres by transforming her style of R&B into pop music." In a similar article, Da’Shan Smith from Revolt noted that while the album "had an electric sensibility directed towards the approaching new millennium, they helped finalize the standard for what a pop&B diva's midtempos and ballads should consist of [...] Looking back at Never Say Never, one could argue that Brandy remodeled the construct of a teen-star-pushing-20." Critics noted that her ability to grow musically while simultaneously balancing life as an actress served as role model material for other teen singers such as Britney Spears and Christina Aguilera who had upcoming studio debuts. In fact, both Spears and Aguilera referred to Norwood and Never Say Never, as one of their influences during the recording sessions for their debut albums.

Aside from boosting Norwood's own success, Never Say Never became instrumental in promoting the careers of many from those involved in the making of the album who were relatively unknown prior to its release, notably chief producer Rodney Jerkins, his brother Fred and songwriter LaShawn Daniels. The trio would go on to work with industry veterans such as Michael Jackson, Whitney Houston, and Toni Braxton as well as upcoming performers such as Jennifer Lopez and Destiny's Child, while reteaming with Norwood – to varying commercial and critical success – on her third and fifth studio albums Full Moon (2002) and Human (2008). Norwood herself commented in a 2018 interview with music website Okayplayer: "Never Say Never changed the course of my life. I found one of the best producers [Rodney Jerkins] in the world to help me find my new sound. I was so free to try things vocally and the Darkchild team gave me their best work and sweet support." In 2020, she ranked the album among her three favorite releases.

Track listing
Credits adapted from the liner notes of Never Say Never.Notes''' 
 denotes additional producer

Personnel
Credits adapted from the liner notes of Never Say Never''.

 Anas Allaf – guitar
 Monica Arnold – lead vocals, backing vocals
 Tom Bender – mixing assistance
 Chuckii Booker – drums
 Leslie Brathwaite – engineer
 Thomas Bricker – art director
 Alex Brown – backing vocals
 Gerry Brown – mixing
 Bridgette Bryant – backing vocals
 Carmen Carter – backing vocals
 Paris Davis – executive producer
 Ken Deranteriasian – engineer, mixing
 Nathan East – bass
 Felipe Elgueta – engineer
 David Foster – keyboard
 Brian Gardner – mastering
 Ben Garrison – engineer
 Brad Gilderman – engineer, mixing
 Nikisha Grierf – backing vocals
 Bernie Grundman – mastering
 Mick Guzauski – mixing
 Dorian Holley – backing vocals
 LaTonya Holman – backing vocals
 Jean-Marie Horvat – engineer
 Richard Jackson – backing vocals
 Bobette Jamison-Harrison – backing vocals
 Rodney Jerkins – executive producer
 Donyle Jones – backing vocals
 Craig Kallman – executive producer
 Vatrena King – backing vocals
 Mario Lucy – engineer
 Carlton Lynn – assistant engineer
 Harvey Mason, Jr. – keyboard
 Harvey Mason, Sr. – percussion
 Victor McCoy – engineer, assistant engineer
 James McCrary – backing vocals
 Kristle Murden – backing vocals
 Brandy Norwood – lead vocals, backing vocals, executive producer, engineer
 Willie Norwood – backing vocals
 Kayla Parker – backing vocals
 Dean Parks – guitar
 Shelly Peiken – backing vocals
 Isaac Phillips – guitar
 Al Schmitt – engineer
 Rick Sigel – engineer
 Alfie Silas – backing vocals
 Dexter Simmons – mixing
 Moana Suchard – engineer, assistant engineer
 Chris Tergesen – engineer
 Joseph Thomas – backing vocals
 Meri Thomas – backing vocals
 Greg Thompson – assistant engineer
 Michael Thompson – guitar
 Carmen Twillie – backing vocals
 Mervyn Warren – backing vocals
 Maxine Waters – backing vocals
 Oren Waters – backing vocals
 Rick Williams – guitar
 Yvonne Williams – backing vocals
 BeBe Winans – backing vocals
 Monalisa Young – backing vocals

Charts

Weekly charts

Year-end charts

Decade-end charts

Certifications

Release history

See also
 Album era
 List of UK R&B Albums Chart number ones of 1998

Notes

References

Bibliography

External links
 Official website

1998 albums
Atlantic Records albums
Albums produced by Rodney Jerkins
Albums produced by Dallas Austin
Albums produced by David Foster
Albums produced by Guy Roche
Brandy Norwood albums